The 2010 Assen Superleague Formula round was a Superleague Formula round  held on May 16, 2010, at the TT Circuit Assen, Assen, Netherlands. It was the first ever round at the Assen circuit and also the first ever one in the Netherlands. It was the second round of the 2010 Superleague Formula season.

Eighteen clubs took part, the seventeen who competed at the previous Silverstone round plus returning 2008 series champions Beijing Guoan. Dutch club PSV Eindhoven took part and it was initially thought that an FC Groningen car, to be driven by ex-F1 racer Jos Verstappen, would participate but the plan was abandoned 5 weeks before the event.

Support races included the Dutch Supercar Challenge and the International Superkart Series.

Report

Qualifying

Race 1

Race 2

Super Final

Results

Qualifying
 In each group, the top four qualify for the quarter-finals.

Group A

Group B

Knockout stages

Grid

Race 1

Race 2

Super Final

Standings after the round

References

External links
 Official results from the Superleague Formula website

Assen
Superleague Formula